Yamada  Bosai Dam is an earthfill dam located in Gifu Prefecture in Japan. The dam is used for flood control. The catchment area of the dam is 14.3 km2. The dam impounds about 13  ha of land when full and can store 1246 thousand cubic meters of water. The construction of the dam was started on 1972 and completed in 1988.

References

Dams in Gifu Prefecture